Boydell & Brewer is an academic press based in Woodbridge, Suffolk, England, that specializes in publishing historical and critical works. In addition to British and general history, the company publishes three series devoted to studies, editions, and translations of material related to the Arthurian legend. There are also series that publish studies in medieval German and French literature, Spanish theatre, early English texts, musicology, and other subjects. Depending on the subject, its books are assigned to one of several imprints in Woodbridge, Cambridge (UK), or Rochester, New York, location of its principal North American office. Imprints include Boydell & Brewer, D.S. Brewer, Camden House, the Hispanic series Tamesis Books ("Tamesis" is the Latin version of the River Thames, which flows through London), the University of Rochester Press, James Currey, and York Medieval Press.

The company was co-founded by historians Richard Barber and Derek Brewer in 1978, merging the two companies Boydell Press and D.S. Brewer which they had respectively founded.

In addition to the company's four primary imprints and partners, Camden House, University of Rochester Press, James Currey, and Tamesis, Boydell & Brewer publish and distribute for the Victoria County History, the Royal Historical Society, the London Record Society and the Scottish Text Society as well as several other societies.

Notes

External links
Boydell & Brewer website This also includes links to the University of Rochester Press site, who is in partnership with Boydell & Brewer, Camden House, Tamesis Books, James Currey, and several other imprints.

1978 establishments in England
Academic publishing companies
Book publishing companies of England
Companies based in Suffolk
Publishing companies established in 1978